Adam Tzanetopoulos (born 10 February 1995) is a Greek professional footballer who plays as a centre-back for Super League club Lamia.

Club career

Born in Volos, Tzanetopoulos joined the Olympiacos academies at the age of 15. Three years later, he left Olympiacos, signing a contract with Niki Volos. His distinguished playing along with his ability in defensive game attracts the interest of both Nikos Liberopoulos and Traianos Dellas.

AEK Athens
Tzanetopoulos joined AEK Athens in 2013. Tzanetopoulos scored his first professional goal against Atromitos in the Greek Cup in a 3–0 home victory. Tzanetopoulos in his first year with the club played in seven Football League 2 games and also scored in the 2–0 win over Kifisia, which meant that AEK had mathematically secured its promotion to the Football League.

The summer friendly international with the winners of last year's UEFA Europa League, Sevilla was a step forward in his career. The Andalusians by having the opportunity to check him realized that he is a player with tremendous perspective, therefore they submitted a proposal to AEK Athens on a long-year loan, with a purchase option of €1.5 million, but was rejected. On 4 February 2016, AEK Athens officially announced that the 21-year-old international central defender Tzanetopoulos renewed his contract, for an undisclosed fee, with the club until the summer of 2020, despite the fact that is not among the first priorities of AEK Athens manager Gus Poyet. "I am very happy for that because it was my desire to stay here, now the only thing in my mind is working hard in order to thank the club's officials for having faith in my ability", said Tzanetopoulos, whose previous contract with AEK was expiring at the end of next season.
On 28 February 2016, in a derby against rivals Panathinaikos returned to the squad after almost three months as a late substitute helping his club to celebrate a 1–0 home win.

As of December 2016, it seemed that international central defender/defensive midfielder of AEK Athens would continue his career at Cyprus, on loan since January.
The 21-year-old player  has performed in only one official match during 2016–17 season, the one against Anagennisi Karditsa for the Greek Cup. Eventually, on 9 January 2017, he was loaned to Iraklis until the end of the season. He finished the second half of the season with 17 appearances and as a result of his solid performances he returned to AEK Athens.

On 26 October 2017, Tzanetopoulos scored after almost 3 years in a comfortable 7–0 Cup away win against Apollon Larissa.

Apollon Smyrnis
On 5 July 2018 Tzanetopoulos joined Apollon Smyrnis on a three-year deal.

Lamia
On 29 January 2019, he signed a contract with Lamia on a free transfer, but he didn't play until the end of 2018–19 season.

On 28 May 2021, he agreed to extend his contract, until the summer of 2024.

International career
On 5 October 2015, the interim national coach Kostas Tsanas called Tzanetopoulos to replace Kyriakos Papadopoulos, who was injured in Bayer Leverkusen Bundesliga's game against Augsburg, for the games against  Northern Ireland and Hungary , for the EURO 2016 qualifiers. This was the first call of the young AEK Athens centre-back.

Tzanetopoulos make his debut as a substitute, on 11 October 2015, in a dramatic 4–3 win game over Hungary for Euro 2016 qualifiers. It was the first and only win of Greece in the qualification round finishing last in the Group F qualifying campaign.

Career statistics

Club

International

Honours
AEK Athens
Super League: 2017–18
Football League: 2014–15 (South Group)
Football League 2: 2013–14 (6th Group)
Greek Cup: 2015–16

Notes

References

External links
 
aekfc.gr

1995 births
Living people
Greek footballers
Niki Volos F.C. players
AEK Athens F.C. players
Apollon Smyrnis F.C. players
Iraklis Thessaloniki F.C. players
Footballers from Volos
Greece under-21 international footballers
Super League Greece players
Football League (Greece) players
PAS Lamia 1964 players
Association football central defenders
Greece international footballers
Olympiacos F.C. players